Andrew Letham Graham (October 10, 1894 – January 18, 1944) was a Canadian ice hockey player. Graham played left wing for six seasons in the National Hockey League for the Ottawa Senators and Hamilton Tigers. He was born in Ottawa, Ontario. He won the Stanley Cup with Ottawa in 1921 and retired in 1925. He also appeared in the 1915 Stanley Cup Finals with the Ottawa Hockey Club against the Vancouver Millionaires, a losing effort.

Life outside of hockey career
Graham participated in World War I and did not play any competitive hockey between the 1915–16 and 1919–20 seasons. While serving in Europe he was exposed to poison gas which permanently affected his physical condition and his level of play.

On July 2, 1939, Graham was seriously injured with severe lacerations to his scalp when his car flew over a fence and turned over in a ditch in a single-vehicle accident in Ottawa. He died less than five years later on January 18, 1944, of a sudden heart attack in Wrightville, Quebec while sitting in the grill room of the Regal Hotel, St. Joseph's Boulevard.

Career statistics

Regular season and playoffs

External links

References

Notes

1894 births
1944 deaths
Canadian ice hockey left wingers
Hamilton Tigers (ice hockey) players
Ice hockey people from Ottawa
Ottawa Senators (1917) players
Ottawa Senators (NHA) players
Stanley Cup champions